The Vanuatu national basketball team are the basketball side that represent Vanuatu in international competitions. It is administered by the Vanuatu Amateur Basketball Federation.

Competitive record

FIBA Oceania Championship
never participated

Pacific Games

?

Oceania Basketball Tournament

never participated

See also

 Vanuatu women's national basketball team

References

External links
Vanuatu Basketball, News, Teams, Scores, ...

Men's national basketball teams
Basketball in Vanuatu
Basketball teams in Vanuatu
1966 establishments in the New Hebrides
basketball